The Modern Diner is a historic diner in Pawtucket, Rhode Island, United States.

Description
The Modern Diner is the only known surviving Sterling Streamliner diner still in operation. Its profile resembles that of a 1934 silver locomotive that once pulled the streamlined Burlington Zephyr train. The diner's roof, now painted maroon, was originally silver. 

New York City inventor Roland Stickney designed the diner, which the John B. Judkins Company of Merrimac, Massachusetts manufactured in 1940. The diner was originally placed at 13 Dexter Street in Pawtucket. It operated at that site until 1984, when it was moved to its present location to avoid demolition. The diner was listed on the National Register of Historic Places in 1978. It was the first diner to be added to the register. 

The diner has been held by the same owner for over 28 years. Its signature Custard French Toast was featured on television's Food Network as one of the "top five diner dishes in the US" in 2015.  

The COVID-19 pandemic caused it to reduce its services during 2020.

Gallery

See also
 List of diners
 National Register of Historic Places listings in Pawtucket, Rhode Island

References

External links

Modern Diner web site

Commercial buildings completed in 1940
Commercial buildings on the National Register of Historic Places in Rhode Island
Diners on the National Register of Historic Places
Restaurants in Rhode Island
Buildings and structures in Pawtucket, Rhode Island
Restaurants established in 1940
Historic American Buildings Survey in Rhode Island
Streamliners
National Register of Historic Places in Pawtucket, Rhode Island
1940 establishments in Rhode Island